The Quirinbach is a small river in Bavaria, Germany. It flows into the Tegernsee, which is drained by the Mangfall, in Sankt Quirin.

See also
List of rivers of Bavaria

Rivers of Bavaria
Rivers of Germany